Vendel (Gallo: Vandèu) is a former commune in the Ille-et-Vilaine department in Brittany in northwestern France. On 1 January 2019, it was merged into the new commune Rives-du-Couesnon.

Geography

The adjacent communes are La Chapelle-Saint-Aubert, Billé, Saint-Georges-de-Chesné, and Saint-Jean-sur-Couesnon.

Population
Inhabitants of Vendel are called Vendelais in French.

See also
Communes of the Ille-et-Vilaine department

References

External links

 Geography of Brittany

Former communes of Ille-et-Vilaine